Denis O'Cullean (some sources O'Culean) was appointed Dean of Armagh in 1416 and is recorded still in post in 1441.

References

Deans of Armagh
14th-century Irish Roman Catholic priests
15th-century Irish Roman Catholic priests